Caroline Sarah J. Alexander (born 3 March 1968) is a cross-country mountain biker and road cyclist born in Barrow-in-Furness. She was a swimmer as a child and did not cycle until she was 20. She first rode a bike in competition in a triathlon: she came second in the swimming and was fastest on the bike. She entered her first mountain bike race, which she won. Within a year she was one of the top three mountain-bike racers in the UK. She left her job as a draughtswoman in Barrow shipyards and became a full-time cyclist.

She represented Britain at the 1996 Summer Olympics in Atlanta and the 2000 Summer Olympics in Sydney. She was a reserve for the British Cycling team at the 2001 UCI road world championships Alexander also represented Britain at the UCI Women's Road World Cup events in 2002. Alexander represented Scotland in the first mountain-bike event in the Commonwealth Games in 2002.

She was the first British female mountain biker to win a UCI World Cup stage in 1997.

Alexander retired from cycling in 2004. In 2009, she was inducted into the British Cycling Hall of Fame.

Major results

1993
 1st  National XC Championships
 2nd  UEC European XC Championships
1994
 1st  National XC Championships
 2nd Overall UCI XC World Cup
1995
 1st  UEC European XC Championships
 1st  National XC Championships
1996
 1st Overall Mountain Bike Tour of Britain
1st 6 Stages
 UCI XC World Cup
2nd Bromont
3rd Helen
1997
 1st  National XC Championships
 UCI XC World Cup
1st Sankt Wendel
2nd Špindlerův Mlýn
1998
 1st  National CX Championships
2000
 1st Stage 3 Redlands Bicycle Classic
 2nd Road race, National Road Championships
 2nd Sea Otter TT
2001
 1st Overall Sea Otter Classic
 2nd Overall UCI XC World Cup
2nd Mont-Sainte-Anne
3rd Durango
 6th UCI World XC Championships
2002
 1st  National XC Championships
 UCI XC World Cup
2nd Houffalize
 5th Cross-country, Commonwealth Games
 7th La Flèche Wallonne

References

1968 births
Living people
Scottish female cyclists
Cross-country mountain bikers
Olympic cyclists of Great Britain
Cyclists at the 1996 Summer Olympics
Cyclists at the 2000 Summer Olympics
Cyclists at the 2002 Commonwealth Games
Sportspeople from Barrow-in-Furness
Commonwealth Games competitors for Scotland